The Fazienda de Ultramar is an Old Spanish book from the early 13th century, that is composed of a geographical and historical journey in the form of a guide for pilgrims to the Holy Land. It has similarities to travel guides and Biblical texts in Romance languages.

Contents 
For the most part, the book is a geographical itinerarium, similar in style to a pilgrims' guide to Jerusalem and Bethlehem. It is not based on a real journey, but on previous journeys. Included in the book is also one of the earliest translations of the Bible in an Iberian Romance language along with some New Testament stories, fragments of hagiography, legends and some classical-era material.

Structure, authorship and dating 
The book opens with two letters: In one, a certain don Remont, archbishop of Toledo, writes to a friend, Almeric, to ask him to write back with information about the Holy Land. The exchange is regarded as genuine and it was surmised that it took place during Raymond de Sauvetât's archbishopric (1124-1152). However, Almeric was French and as such the letters would have been written in Latin or, less likely, in French.

Manuscripts 
There is one surviving manuscript, which is housed in the library of the University of Salamanca. In 1965, it was edited by 
Moshé Lazar, attributing it to the archdean of Antakya, Almeric y dating it at between 1126 and 1142.

Notes

References 
DEYERMOND, Alan D., Historia de la literatura española, vol. 1: La Edad Media, Barcelona, Ariel, 2001 (1ª ed. 1973), págs. 147-149. ISBN 84-344-8305-X
LACARRA, María Jesús y LÓPEZ ESTRADA, Francisco, Orígenes de la prosa, Madrid, Júcar, 1993.

External links 
 Anca Crivăț, «Los libros medievales de viajes en el ámbito hispánico», Los libros de viajes de la Edad Media española, Bucarest, Universitatea din Bucuresti, Bucarest, 2003. ISBN 973-575-761-3 (sobre la Fazienda de Ultramar, aquí)
 
 Martínez Álvarez, Josefina, «Notas sobre el léxico de la "Fazienda de Ultra Mar"», edición digital a partir de Actas del II Congreso Internacional de Historia de la Lengua Española. Tomo I, Madrid, Pabellón de España, 1992, pp. 1195-1203. Biblioteca Virtual Miguel de Cervantes, 2007.

Note: This article is a translation of Spanish Wikipedia's article on :es:Fazienda de Ultramar, which includes material from wikillerato (educared) , published under licence Creative Commons 2.5

Old Spanish literature
13th-century books